Gerasimus III may refer to:

 Patriarch Gerasimus III of Alexandria, ruled in 1783–1788
 Gerasimus III of Constantinople, Ecumenical Patriarch in 1794–1797